The 1993–94 NCAA football bowl games concluded the 1993 NCAA Division I-A football season. In the second year of the Bowl Coalition era, the 1994 Orange Bowl was designated as the national championship game, pitting Florida State (11–1), ranked first in the AP Poll and third in the Coaches Poll, against Nebraska (11–0), ranked second in the AP Poll and first in the Coaches Poll. Undefeated and untied West Virginia was ranked second in the Coaches Poll but was relegated to the Sugar Bowl after finishing in third in the Bowl Coalition composite rankings. Florida State defeated Nebraska in the Orange Bowl, which, along with West Virginia's loss to Florida in the Sugar Bowl, allowed Florida State to secure a national championship in both major polls.

A total of 19 bowl games were played between December 17, 1993 and January 1, 1994 by 38 bowl-eligible teams. One new bowl game was added during the 1993–94 season: the Alamo Bowl, held in San Antonio, Texas.

Non-Coalition bowls

Bowl Coalition bowls

References